is a Japanese racewalker. He competed in the men's 20 kilometres walk at the 1976 Summer Olympics.

References

1945 births
Living people
Place of birth missing (living people)
Japanese male racewalkers
Olympic male racewalkers
Olympic athletes of Japan
Athletes (track and field) at the 1976 Summer Olympics
Asian Athletics Championships winners
Japan Championships in Athletics winners